Henry Bruen (1741	– 14 December 1795) was an Irish politician. In the pre-Act of Union Parliament of Ireland, he was Member of Parliament (MP) for Jamestown from 1783 to 1790, and then for Carlow County from 1790 until his death in 1795.

Family 

Henry was the second son of Moses Bruen (died 1757), from Boyle, County Roscommon. He married Dorothea Henrietta Knox, daughter of Francis Knox, in 1787. They had three sons and three daughters: their eldest son Henry (1789–1852), was an MP for County Carlow for most of the period from 1812 to 1852, and their youngest child Francis was MP for Carlow Borough in the 1830s. Henry's son Henry Bruen (1828–1912), was MP for County Carlow from 1857 to 1880.

From 1775 until 1957, the family lived in Oak Park estate, near Carlow town.

References 

1741 births
1795 deaths
Politicians from County Roscommon
Politicians from County Carlow
Irish MPs 1783–1790
Irish MPs 1790–1797
Members of the Parliament of Ireland (pre-1801) for County Leitrim constituencies
Members of the Parliament of Ireland (pre-1801) for County Carlow constituencies